Jojo: The Violet Mystery is a 2000 animated Christmas television special. It is based on three albums of the Jojo comics by André Geerts: La fugue de Jojo, Le mystère Violaine, and Le serment d'amitié. In Belgium, it premiered on 21 December 2000 on La Deux's Ici Bla-Bla programme. It also aired on Christmas Day, 2000 on TF1 in France and Switzerland on TSR.

As of 2002, Dupuis was also producing a 78 episode Jojo series with TF1 Jeunesse.

Plot
There is a new classmate, Violet, at the school attended by eight-year-olds Jojo and Fat Louis. She is ridiculed for her big nose, and later runs away on Christmas Eve.

See also
 List of Christmas films

References

External links
 Jojo on Mediatoon Distribution website
 Review on Le Soir

2000 animated films
2000 films
2000 television films
2000 television specials
2000s animated television specials
2000s French animated films
2000s Christmas films
Animated films based on comics
Belgian animated films
Belgian television films
Christmas television specials
Films based on Belgian comics
French animated films
French Christmas films
French television films
2000s French-language films
French-language Belgian films